Webfoot Technologies is an American developer of personal computer games and video games for various platforms. Titles developed include Hello Kitty: Happy Party Pals and various Dragon Ball Z games for the Game Boy Advance.

Webfoot is best known for its series of Dragon Ball Z games for the Game Boy Advance which were published by Infogrames and Atari. This includes the best selling Dragon Ball Z: The Legacy of Goku series of RPG games. Webfoot has also developed other games based on popular licenses including The Legend of Korra, American Girl, Tonka, Hello Kitty, Fear Factor, and Phil Mickelson Golf.

The firm was founded during the early days of the web by Dana Dominiak and Pascal Pochol.  The original catalog of titles included mostly DOS-based games, but they later expanded to Microsoft Windows software and eventually Apple Macintosh, Palm Pilot, Windows Mobile (Pocket PC), and handheld platforms including the Game Boy Advance and Nintendo DS. Webfoot's earliest Windows title was probably the cult classic DROD: Deadly Rooms of Death which was programmed by Erik Hermansen.  Several of Webfoot's budget products became popular in the late 1990s with best-sellers such as 3D Frog Frenzy, 3D Pinball Express, Super Huey III, and Mahjong Ultimate.

Handheld games
 American Girl: Kit Mystery Challenge for Nintendo DS
 American Girl: Julie Finds a Way for Nintendo DS
 Dream Day Wedding for Nintendo DS
 Dragon Ball Z: The Legacy of Goku for Game Boy Advance
 Dragon Ball Z: The Legacy of Goku II for Game Boy Advance
 Dragon Ball Z: Buu's Fury for Game Boy Advance
 Dragon Ball GT: Transformation for Game Boy Advance
 Dragon Ball Z: Taiketsu for Game Boy Advance
 Dragon Ball Z Legacy of Goku I and II: 2 Games In 1 for Game Boy Advance
 Dragon Ball Z Buu's Fury and Dragon Ball GT Transformations Dual Pack for  Game Boy Advance
 Fabulous Finds for Nintendo DS
 Fancy Nancy: Tea Party Time for Nintendo DS
 Hello Kitty: Happy Party Pals for  Game Boy Advance
 Homie Rollerz for Nintendo DS
 Mahjong: Ancient China Adventure for Nintendo DS
 My Little Pony Crystal Princess: The Runaway Rainbow for Game Boy Advance
 My Little Pony: Pinkie Pie's Party for Nintendo DS
 Scripp's Spelling Bee for Nintendo DS
 Texas Hold'em Poker Pack for Nintendo DS
 The Biggest Loser for Nintendo DS
 The Legend of Korra: A New Era Begins for the Nintendo 3DS
 The Trash Pack for Nintendo DS and Nintendo 3DS
 Tonka on the Job for Game Boy Advance
 You Don't Know Jack for Nintendo DS

Console games
 Mahjong Party for Wii

Published PC games
 3D Alien Invasion
 3D Brick Bustin' Madness / 3D Brick Busters
 3D Bubble Burst / Sea Bubble Burst
 3D Bug Attack
 3D Caveman Rocks / Journey to Stonehenge
 3D Cube Hopper/ Boingers / Jumpy's World
 3D Coyote Helicopter Hunter / BSE Hunter
 3D Dragon Castle / 3D Dragon Duel
 3D Frog Frenzy
 3D Galaxy Fighters
 3D Marble Flip
 3D Maze Man: Amazing Adventures / 3D Frog Man / 3D Ms. Maze / Lady Cruncher / Cruncher in Mazeland
 3D Missile Madness
 3D Pinball Express
 3D Super Row Mania
 3D Tetri Madness
 Assault Trooper
 Bluppo
 Crystalize
 Crystalize II
 Deadly Rooms of Death
 Dynamite
 Flying Froggies
 [[Forbidden Forest (video game)|Forbidden Forest III]] Game Room Interpose Kar Racing King's Collection for Windows/Valusoft
 Missile Madness My Little Pony: Crystal Princess Runaway Rainbow Pinball Master II Safari Kongo / 3D Frog Frenzy 2
 Super Chopper 
 Super Huey III 
 Texas Hold'em High Stakes Poker 
 Tonka On The Job
 Tronic (MS-DOS, 1996, developed by TLK Games)

Mobile games
 Fear Factor: Delirium for mobile phone
 Mazetrix for Apple iPhone
 Phil Mickelson Mobile Golf for mobile phone

External links
 
 Legacy of Goku II Q & A (interview)
 Legacy of Goku Interview (FUNimation interview)
 Webfoot Technologies profile on MobyGames

Video game companies of the United States
Video game development companies
 
Video game companies established in 1993
Lemont, Illinois
Companies based in DuPage County, Illinois